White House Farm (broadcast in some countries under the titles White House Farm Murders and The Murders at White House Farm) is a British television crime drama based on the real-life events that took place in August 1985.

The series was produced by New Pictures for ITV and distributed worldwide by All3Media. It was broadcast by ITV on 8 January 2020.

Premise
The series is based on true events from 6 August 1985. Five members of the Bamber-Caffell family are shot to death at White House Farm, Essex. The police, led by detectives DCI Taff Jones (Stephen Graham) and DS Stan Jones (Mark Addy),  are called in to investigate.

When questioning the Bambers' son, Jeremy Bamber, he claims that his sister, Sheila, who was suffering from schizophrenia, went "berserk", got hold of a silenced rifle and killed their parents and Sheila's six-year old twin sons. As the murder case unravels, a devastating twist comes to light.

Cast

 Stephen Graham as DCI Taff Jones
 Freddie Fox as Jeremy Bamber
 Cressida Bonas as Sheila Caffell
 Mark Addy as DS Stan Jones
 Gemma Whelan as Ann Eaton
 Mark Stanley as Colin Caffell
 Alexa Davies as Julie Mugford
 Alfie Allen as Brett Collins
 Millie Brady as Sally Jones
 Amanda Burton as June Bamber
 Nicholas Farrell as Nevill Bamber
 Scott Reid as DC Mick Clark
 Grace Calder as Heather Amos
 Oliver Dimsdale as Peter Eaton
 Richard Goulding as David Boutflour

Episodes

Production and release

The series was first reported on in August 2018, when filming had begun. Stephen Graham, Freddie Fox, Cressida Bonas and Alexa Davies were announced as the main cast. Further details of the show were revealed by ITV in October 2019, and a release was scheduled for early 2020. The trailer was released in December 2019, and the series began airing on ITV on 8 January 2020. It was released on DVD in February 2020.

International release 
International distribution of the series was handled by All3Media. In November 2019, HBO Max closed a deal to air the series on their service in the United States; it was released in September 2020 under the title The Murders at White House Farm. The series was also aired in the Netherlands in June 2020 by the Dutch broadcaster KRO-NCRV, adding the word "Murders" to the series' title.

Filming locations 

The real-life murders took place in the village of Tolleshunt D'Arcy. No scenes in White House Farm were filmed there; instead, the producers chose other locations to replicate the area. The scenes of Jeremy Bamber's trial were filmed in the same courthouse that the real-life trial took place in, Chelmsford Crown Court.

Reception
On the review aggregation website Rotten Tomatoes, White House Farm holds an approval rating of 82%, based on 17 reviews. On Metacritic, which assigns a weighted average score out of 100 to reviews from mainstream critics, the film received an average score of 58 based on 4 reviews, indicating a "mixed or average" response.

Stephen Graham's portrayal of Welsh detective "Taff" Jones drew some criticism, with a number of pundits, including Carolyn Hitt of WalesOnline, stating that his Welsh accent was inauthentic. Some online commentators described the accent as the "worst screen accent since Dick Van Dyke".

Podcast 
On 18 September 2020 an official companion podcast produced by iHeartRadio was announced via a trailer published across all podcasting platforms, with the first episode premiering on 24 September 2020 alongside the release of the series on HBO Max.

Hosted by three-time Emmy award-winning producer Lauren Bright Pacheco, the podcast features conversations with the creators of the series, experts on the case, and family members of the deceased to "provide context to what’s happening on screen as well as extended audio clips to further immerse the listener in the world of the show."

References

External links
 

2020 British television series debuts
2020 British television series endings
2020s British crime drama television series
2020s British television miniseries
English-language television shows
ITV crime dramas
Maldon District
Murder in television
Television series by All3Media
Television shows set in Essex
Television series set in 1985
Television series based on actual events